This is a description of the role of The Lord Mayor of Portsmouth and a list of notable Mayors and the later Lord Mayors of the city of Portsmouth in the United Kingdom.

Portsmouth had elected a mayor annually since 1531. The city was awarded the dignity of a Lord Mayoralty by letters patent dated 10 July  1928.
When the city became a non-metropolitan borough in 1974 the honour was confirmed by letters patent dated 1 April 1974.

History 

Portsmouth was granted Letters Patent in 1926, providing that Portsmouth would henceforth be a city and in 1928 further letters patent provided that the Chief Magistrate should cease to be called simply Mayor and would be raised to the dignity of Lord Mayor.

Before local government reorganisation in 1974 any citizen could be Lord Mayor, although in practice it was usually a member of the council. After 1974 it was a requirement that the Lord Mayor had to be a serving member of the elected council. The Lord Mayor nominates the Lady Mayoress or Consort.

Symbols of Office

Coat of Arms 

Portsmouth has borne its arms, comprising an azure shield bearing a gold star and crescent, for more than 700 years. The motto, 'Heaven's light, our guide', was registered in 1929. In 1970, the Portsmouth Museums Society sponsored a petition to The Earl Marshal for a grant of supporters, crest and badge to complete the city's full achievement.

The city was granted the rare privilege of bearing a maritime version echoing the Royal supporters - a sea lion and sea unicorn, reflecting Portsmouth's long association with the Crown. The unicorn wears a Naval Crown and the mighty Chain of Iron, which is a pictorial representation of the chain boom - from Tudor times, this was stretched from the Round Tower, Old Portsmouth, to Fort Blockhouse, Gosport, as a protection to Portsmouth harbour. The mural crown worn by the sea lion refers to the land defences, which surrounded Portsmouth from Elizabethan times until 1862.

Ownership of the original arms was confirmed at the Heraldic Visitations of 1622 and 1686. Various theories suggest how Portsmouth first acquired these historic arms. It was the two well-known local historians, H.T. Lilley and A.T. Everitt, who first suggested in 1921 that Portsmouth's seal was based on the arms of William de Longchamp. He was Lord Chancellor to Richard I at the time of the granting of the town's first definitive charter on 2 May 1194.

The Richard I connection 
However, as William de Longchamp had also adopted a variation of the arms used by Richard I on his first Great Seal, there is no reason why Portsmouth should not similarly have adopted a variation of Richard's arm direct, as a compliment to the King for the favours he had shown the Town during his brief reign. Richard's first great seal showed on either side of his head a star with six wavy rays (known as an estoile) above a crescent moon.

On some specimens of his first Great Seal an eight-pointed star was used. It is not known for certain whether Richard adopted this device as a result of going on the Crusades to Palestine in 1191, or whether it was a punning reference to the star called Regulus in the constellation of Leo, which is commonly known a "Cor Leonis", or "Heart of the Lion" - a play on words on Richard's nickname.

The use of the city's arms is confined to the council. Only they can grant the use of the badge to organisations with strong links with the city. The badge comprises the city's ancient Arms on a roundel crossed by a sword and anchor to mark the city's naval and military connections.

The Guildhall 
The Lord Mayor’s official seat is The Guildhall, Guildhall Square, in which he has a suite of rooms, located on the 2nd Floor, which include the Lord Mayor's office and parlour, antechamber, Banqueting room and The Lady Mayoress' Parlour. The city’s Royal Charters, the three Maces, gifts to the city and the civic silver collection are also on display there.

The Guildhall is also the place in which The Lord Mayor is elected, every year a 'Mayor making' ceremony takes places in the auditorium. The Lord Mayor is formally elected by Full Council and is presented with his robes and chains of office before being granted the Keys to the City, which they must present if the monarch visits the city. They are also presented with the Portsmouth Sword - a symbol of the interdependence between the city and the Royal Navy.

Mayoral record panels 

In the Council Chamber of The Guildhall, designed by the architect E. Berry-Webber following the  destruction of the building's original Victorian interior by incendiary bombs during WW2, There are ten Mayoral record panels, grouped in twos - they carry the names of the Mayors and Lord Mayors of Portsmouth since The Corporation's records of the annual election of the Mayor began in 1531. The panels include information such as their years in office and brief summaries of national and local events of consequence.

Following much careful research, artists F Angello del Cauchferta, MGLC (Spain), and Beryl Hardman, ARCA, of London, illuminated each panel with scenes, both momentous and whimsical, from the period it encompasses. Entries have continued to be made and illuminated for each successive Lord Mayor.

The Lord Mayor's chain and badge 

The gold chain and badge are the outward signs of the office of the Lord Mayor. The chain is worn within the city when performing official civic functions, important ceremonial occasions and also as appropriate at other times, such as opening conferences, fetes and new businesses.

The chain may also be worn when paying visits to such places as schools, churches and the emergency services, at the Lord Mayor's discretion. The badge is only worn outside the city on official engagements and is worn according to protocol - permission is sought from the Mayor or Chairman of the Borough to be visited.

The chain comprises a clasp in the shape of the ancient Domus Dei, from which plain rectangular links (with the names of successive Mayors and Lord Mayors inscribed on them) pass on either side to shields engraved with the obverse and reverse of the corporate seal. The links then change their shape to a handsome bold curb; part plain and part engraved. On the next shields the maritime anchors stand in full relief and the centre shield bears the crest of Henry Ford, Mayor in 1859, when the chain was acquired.

From the Chain hangs the badge, a massive pendant in rich scrollwork supporting a blue enamel shield with the star and crescent upon it, supported by the mace and sword of state . Engraved on the back of the badge is the legend:

"Purchased by subscription amongst the burgesses and presented to the Worshipful the Mayor of Corporation of the Borough during the Mayoralty of Henry Ford Esq., under a committee composed of G Cressweller Esq. (Chairman), Mr Alderman Orange, Mr LA Vandenburgh, Mr WO Marshall, Mr E M Frost, Mr H D Davey, Mr E M Wells, Mr Dudley, Mr G Rake, Mr W Treadgold, Mr G Long, Mr William D King (Hon Sec) Portsmouth, September 1859"

The diamond-studded crown over the enamelled scroll bears the words "Jubilee V 1887 R Year" and now surmounts the Mayor's crest in the centre of the Chain, with the following inscription "Presented by A S Blake Esq., Mayor, 1885-86.

The Lady Mayoress or Consort's chain 

This is a smaller, more slender replica of the Lord Mayor's chain. The badge bears the following inscription

"In commemoration of the 60th year of the reign of Queen Victoria, this Chain and Badge was purchased by members of the Council and presented to Mrs Couzens for the use of herself and her successors in the office of Mayoress/Consort, 1897"

This chain was worn for the first time on the occasion of the election of Mayor by Mrs H Kimber, Mayoress, 1897-98.

Robes of office 

The Lord Mayor has two sets of robes, the first worn for the most important civic occasions is a set made of black silk damask trimmed with heavy gold lace detailing and the city's coat of arms embroidered in gold on the back. It is nearly identical to the set worn by The Lord Chancellor. The second set of robes is scarlet with fur trimming, this is worn on less formal occasions, such as Full Council meetings. Both of these robes are worn with a lace jabot and cuffs with white cotton gloves and a feather plumed tricorne hat.

A plain black gown, similar to an academic gown is worn at times of national mourning, it was most recently worn in September 2022 by Lord Mayor Cllr. Hugh Mason on the death of Queen Elizabeth II, having not been seen for 70 years.

The Deputy Lord Mayor also wears a robe, which he wears alongside his chain of office. This consists of a blue wool robe with black facings and two inch black velvet on the edge of the gown and sleeves, differing from that of a councillor. This is worn with a bicorne hat for men and tricorne for women on important occasions. 

Councillors also wear robes, some of which date back to 1949. These are black wool with blue facing detailing and two inch velvet trimmings on the sleeves. Aldermanic robes are the same design but with red facings. Both of these robes are worn with a bicorne hat for men and tricorne for women, with past Lord Mayor's having gold braid on their hat as opposed to black.

The Lord Mayor's car, Mace Bearer and Duties 
The City Council provides an allowance for The Lord Mayor to carry out their duties, as part of this a civic staff is employed, with a member of this staff serving as attendant, chauffeur and mace bearer. Although the car The Lord Mayor uses has varied over the years, having been at one time a Daimler and presently a Jaguar, the number plate has remained the same, 'BK 1'. This being the first number plate issued in the City of Portsmouth. 

Having their own vehicle allows The Lord Mayor to attend many community functions and engagements during their year of office. This is the primary and most visible part of their role but they have the important role of presiding at civic events and Full Council meetings. In addition to this they are an ex officio member of several organisations and boards, including The Lord Mayor of Portsmouth's Coronation Homes, named after the post.

The Three Maces 

A mace was originally a heavy club used as an offensive weapon, but later became a staff of office symbolising authority, with the head often elaborately worked in precious metal or bejewelled.

The Great Mace is silver gilt, similar to several others which Charles II ordered to be made and presented to various Corporations that had lost their regalia during the Civil Wars between his father and Parliament. The pattern of the shaft leaves little doubt that the Mace was made earlier than 1678 - it was probably made during the Commonwealth period and converted into a Royal Mace at the Restoration. This mace is placed on the clerk's table in The Council Chamber for every meeting to represent the authority of the sovereign, it is also carried in procession and placed on display during civic processions and events. During times of national mourning the mace is covered with a black cloth and inverted when carried. 

The two smaller maces used in the procession appear to date back to Tudor times. One is a small antique silver Mace with a cup shaded head and a slender stem. On one side of the head is the Tudor Rose crowned, and on the other side a Fleur-de-lis crowned, both repoussé and gilt. On the circular top of the head are the Arms of James I, somewhat defaced. The other small Mace is of silver parcel gilt about the same size as the first but with a much stouter stem. On either side of the head is a star rudely engraved. The cresting or coronet at the top is composed of Fleur-de-lis and Lozenges alternately within which, on a raised boss, are the Arms of King Charles II.

List of Mayors of Portsmouth

Lord Mayors of Portsmouth

References

Further reading
 Source : (1531–2005) History in Portsmouth
 
 Source : (2006–2013) Portsmouth City Council
 

 
Portsmouth, Lord Mayors of the City of
 
Mayors